Arboleda is a town and municipality in Colombia. Arboleda may also refer to
Arboledas, municipality in Colombia
Arboledas, Argentina
Adriana Arboleda, Colombian model and presenter
Danilo Arboleda, Colombian footballer
Harold Arboleda, Filipino basketball player
Manuel Arboleda, Colombian footballer
Mireya Arboleda, Colombian classical pianist
Níver Arboleda, Colombian footballer
William Arboleda, Colombian footballer
Wynne Arboleda, Filipino basketball player
Yazmany Arboleda, Colombian-American artist